António Pereira (4 April 1888 – 17 February 1978) was a Portuguese wrestler and weightlifter. He competed in the wrestling at the 1912 Summer Olympics and in the weightlifting at the 1924 Summer Olympics and 1928 Summer Olympics.

References

External links
 

1888 births
1978 deaths
Portuguese male sport wrestlers
Portuguese male weightlifters
Olympic wrestlers of Portugal
Olympic weightlifters of Portugal
Wrestlers at the 1912 Summer Olympics
Weightlifters at the 1924 Summer Olympics
Weightlifters at the 1928 Summer Olympics
Sportspeople from Lisbon